The Caraula is a left tributary of the river Suceava. Its source is located in Chernivtsi Raion, Chernivtsi Oblast, Ukraine. The river then crosses the border into Romania, joining the Suceava near the village of Vicovu de Sus.

References

Rivers of Romania
Rivers of Chernivtsi Oblast
Rivers of Suceava County